Ricardo Job Estévão (born August 22, 1987 in Moxico, Angola), better known as Job, is an Angolan football midfielder, who plays for Petro Atlético in the Girabola.

Career
Job currently plays for Petro Atlético in the capital Luanda since 2008, he has previously played for Atlético Sport Aviação.

International career
Job has 16 caps for the national team and has scored one goal as well. He was called in the squad for the 2010 African Nations Cup.

International goals
Scores and results list Angola's goal tally first.

References

External links
 
 

1984 births
Living people
Footballers from Luanda
Angolan footballers
Angola international footballers
2010 Africa Cup of Nations players
Atlético Sport Aviação players
Atlético Petróleos de Luanda players
Girabola players
2011 African Nations Championship players
People from Moxico Province
Association football midfielders
Angola A' international footballers
2018 African Nations Championship players